Order of the Shadow: Act I is the fifth studio album by the American band Psyclon Nine. It was officially released through Metropolis Records on November 12, 2013. Order of the Shadow: Act I is the third and final installment in the trilogy of albums that started with Crwn Thy Frnicatr and We the Fallen.

Nero Bellum worked closely with Chris Vrenna (formerly of Nine Inch Nails and Marilyn Manson) on the production of the album. It continued the industrial black metal fusion previously heard on We the Fallen, but was heavily influenced by industrial rock, notably Marilyn Manson's Antichrist Superstar and Nine Inch Nails's The Downward Spiral.

According to frontman Nero Bellum, it is supposedly Psyclon Nine's final album. In an interview Nero had this to say about the album: "The trilogy came to me in a dream. Let's put it this way, Order of the Shadow is the last Psyclon Nine record, although I may add installments to it, which is why I labeled it Act I. I always knew this would be the last record, so let's see what happens."

Track listing

Personnel
Psyclon Nine
 Nero Bellum – vocals
 Rotny Ford – guitar, synth
 Merritt Goodwin – bass guitar
 Jon Siren – drums
 Glitch Nix – samples, synth
Production Team
 Chris Vrenna, Jamison Boaz, Nero Bellum

References

2013 albums
Psyclon Nine albums